Penkridge Viaduct is a railway viaduct on the West Coast Main Line where it crosses the River Penk and Levedale Road near the village of Penkridge, Staffordshire, England.  It is recorded in the National Heritage List for England as a designated Grade II listed building.

It was built in 1837 on the Grand Junction Railway. The engineer was Joseph Locke and the contractor was Thomas Brassey.  It was Brassey's first successful bid for a contract and the cost of the viaduct was £6,000 (£ as of 2015).  The viaduct consists of seven arches built in red brick and engineering brick with ashlar quoins and dressings.

The first train, on a trial run, crossed the viaduct on 1 June 1837.  The official opening was on 4 July, when the viaduct was crossed by engine No. 8 Wild Fire pulling eight first class carriages.

See also
Listed buildings in Penkridge
List of structures built by Thomas Brassey

References

Grand Junction Railway
Bridges completed in 1837
Railway viaducts in Staffordshire
Grade II listed buildings in Staffordshire
Viaduct